Al-Markhiya Sports Club is a Qatari multi-sports club, based in the Al Markhiya district of Doha.  Its football department plays in the Qatar Stars League. It was widely regarded as the fastest improving team due to it winning the Second Division league 4 times in the first 5 it has taken part of. It has also entered history by being the first second division club to be promoted to the Qatar Stars League. The club was founded in 1995 as Al-Ittifaq, but was renamed to Al-Markhiya in 2004 to better represent the district where it is located.

Honours
Qatari Second Division
 Winners (6): 1995, 1996, 1997, 1999, 2017, 2022

Stadium
Built in 1995, the Al-Markhiya Stadium covers 68,000 m2 and features a football pitch with a capacity for 200 people, locker rooms and an administrative office. However, due to its insufficient capacity and facilities, the club frequently uses Saoud bin Abdulrahman Stadium as its homegrounds.

Current squad

As of Qatari Second Division:

Technical staff
Last update: 21 July 2012.

List of managers

References

Markhiya Sports Club
1995 establishments in Qatar